Mosquitos is a New York City–based musical band consisting of guitarist Chris Root, keyboardist Jon Marshall Smith, and Brazilian singer JuJu Stulbach. The sound of Mosquitos has been described as a mix of bossa nova and indie pop.

History
Root and Stulbach met in New York City, and later recorded their first tracks together in Brazil. Root had to leave Brazil without a finished mix, but soon after met Smith back in New York City. Eventually the three teamed up and formed Mosquitos. Much of the band's lyrics are autobiographical, referring to the relationship between Root and Stulbach.

Discography
2003 - Mosquitos (Bar/None Records)
2004 - Sunshine Barato (Bar/None Records)
2006 - III (Bar/None Records)
2017 - Mexican Dust (Six Degrees Records)

Interesting facts
 Chris Root is also the leader of A.M. Sixty.
 JuJu Stulbach sings in both English and Brazilian Portuguese.
 The band's song "Boombox" was heard on a first-season episode of the FX Network show Nip/Tuck, on a first-season episode of the Fox Network show The O.C., on an episode of MTV's The Real World, and a fifth-season episode of Malcolm in the Middle.
JuJu sings a cover of "Have You Ever Seen the Rain?", originally by Creedence Clearwater Revival, in a 2008 GE commercial.
 The modern band is not associated with The Mosquitoes, the fictional Beatles parody band that played on the Gilligan's Island TV show.

References

External links
Chris Root Music
Mosquitos biography on Bar/None Records
Mosquitos biography on Six Degrees Records
Blame It on the Bossa Nova
[ Mosquitos] at Allmusic.com

Musical groups established in 2003
Musical groups from New York City